The Lewis & Harris Football Association is a football association which controls the Lewis & Harris League is the annual football league contested between clubs from Lewis and Harris, an island off Great Britain in Scotland.  Like several other northern amateur leagues, the competition takes place in a summer calendar rather than the traditional winter program.

Lewis contributes eight clubs to the league and Harris contributes one. The league is fully licensed with the Scottish Amateur Football Association and each club competes in the Highland Amateur Cup annually, with member clubs winning the cup eight times in its history.

Member clubs 
Back
Carloway
Harris
Lochs
Ness 
Point
Stornoway Athletic
Stornoway United
West Side

List of Lewis and Harris Football League champions

Performance by Club

Representative team 

A 'select' team representing Lewis & Harris periodically enters cup competitions organized by the North Caledonian Football Association.

This team should not be confused with the Western Isles representative team, which competes at the Island Games and usually selects players from both the Lewis & Harris and Uist & Barra amateur leagues.

As of 2017, the squad is managed by Kevin Anderson. The team, to date, has triumphed in one cup competition - when they won 1–0 against Golspie Sutherland in the final of the North Caledonian Cup at Dalmore Park, Alness. The match, contested in November 2014, was broadcast with live commentary on BBC Radio nan Gàidheal.

Honours
North Caledonian Cup: 2014–15

External links
Lewis & Harris AFA League Website

Football in the Outer Hebrides
Football leagues in Scotland
Football governing bodies in Scotland
Organisations based in the Outer Hebrides
Amateur association football in Scotland